Méhkeréki Sportegyesület was a professional football club based in Méhkerék, Békés County, Hungary, that competed in the Nemzeti Bajnokság III, the third tier of Hungarian football.

Name changes
1950–2018: Méhkeréki Sportegyesület

References

External links
 Official website of Méhkeréki SE
 Profile on Magyar Futball

Football clubs in Hungary
Association football clubs established in 1950
1950 establishments in Hungary